The Night Watchman (French title: Jamais de la vie) is a 2015 French-Belgian thriller film directed by Pierre Jolivet. The story revolves around Franck, a shopping mall night watchman, who discovers a planned holdup. The movie won the Golden Goblet Award for Best Feature Film at the 2015 Shanghai International Film Festival.

Cast and characters
 Olivier Gourmet as Franck
 Valérie Bonneton as Mylène
 Marc Zinga as Ketu
 Thierry Hancisse as Étienne
 Jean-François Cayrey as Antoine
 Paco Boublard as Le Bouclé
 Nader Boussandel as Ahmed
 Vincent Debost as Denis
 Yassine Douighi as Chad
 Guerassim Dichliev as Algas
 Soufiane Guerrab as Ziad
 Julie Ferrier as Jeanne
 Bénabar as Pedro

References

External links
 

2015 films
2015 thriller films
2010s French-language films
French thriller films
Films directed by Pierre Jolivet
Belgian thriller films
French-language Belgian films
2010s French films